NYX is a limited series of comic books by Marvel Comics, consisting of seven issues, published between 2003 and 2005.
It is written by Joe Quesada with art by Joshua Middleton (issues #1–4) and Rob Teranishi (issues #5-7). 
NYX stands for District X, New York City.

The series features homeless teenage mutants in New York City: time-freezing Kiden, shape-shifting Tatiana, body-shifting Bobby, his mysterious brother Lil Bro, the female clone of Wolverine (X-23), and Cameron, a woman with no powers.
The series featured the first comic book appearance of X-23, a character originally created on the X-Men: Evolution cartoon. Although the series was cancelled in 2005, 2009 saw the 6-issue miniseries, NYX: No Way Home.

Publication history
In 2001 writer Brian Wood developed a concept of the series for Marvel with artist David Choe that was to launch Marvel's MAX imprint. The ongoing series, focusing on the characters and how their powers affect their lives, friends and family, was to star Gambit, Rogue, and Jubilee, as well as Angie and Purge, two new characters Wood had created for the series. After Marvel aborted the project, deeming it not suitable for their audience, Wood used parts of this concept for his series Demo.

NYX was planned as an ongoing series, but later was shortened to a miniseries. Throughout the entire publication, there were often long delays between issues because Quesada had always been late with scripts. 
The first five issues of the series were reprinted in two Marvel Must Haves issues in the summer of 2005, before the sixth issue was released in July. The seventh and last issue was released in September 2005.

Failed spin-off
A second series of NYX was planned for release in 2007, but never materialized.

No Way Home
At the 2008 New York Comic Con, a new NYX series was officially announced to launch in August 2008.

NYX: No Way Home is written by Marjorie M. Liu, with art by Kalman Andrasofszky.

Cecilia Reyes makes an appearance in NYX: No Way Home #4.

Synopsis

Wannabe

The series starts with a flashback during which Kiden's father is killed during a drive-by shooting while he and Kiden are getting ice cream. Switching to the present, we see Kiden as an emotionally disturbed teenager who gets into an altercation with another student who is a Latin King gangbanger. She manifests her mutant power during a fight and unintentionally breaks the student's arm. He returns with a gun and she freezes time again before the bullet hits her, but it hits her teacher, Mrs. Cameron, instead. Several months later Mrs. Cameron, whose life has fallen apart as a result of the incident, attempts to commit suicide. Kiden shows up and rescues her after receiving a warning from the ghost of her father. A second vision tells them to visit the Hotel Brasil, where they find X-23, who is working as a prostitute, in a compromising position: standing over her john whose suicide she has just witnessed. The three escape together, but X-23's pimp is upset and sends a hit squad to Mrs. Cameron's apartment. Again, the ghost of Kiden's father warns them, just in time, to leave. Later they bump into Tatiana, who has turned into a dog-beast after touching a puppy that was hit by a car. Tatiana is able to scare away a mob after killing a cat and turning into a werecat. The runaways form a crew and live on the streets, begging for money and dumpsterdiving for food. Eventually they decide to return to Mrs. Cameron's apartment to find money and leave town. X-23's pimp, Zebra Daddy, tracks them down with the help of a banger named Felon, but again Kiden's father appears and warns them. During the confrontation at Mrs. Cameron's apartment, X-23 kills most of the pimp's gang before getting gunned down by Zebra Daddy. Mrs. Cameron falls out her apartment window, and Kiden then must decide whether to kill Zebra Daddy (who it turns out was her father's shooter) or save Mrs. Cameron. Remembering how Mrs. Cameron had taken a bullet for her, she opts to save her. Zebra Daddy is about to kill them but X-23 heals from her wounds and executes him. The team leaves together. In the denouement, it turns out Felon's little brother is also a mutant, and it was he who created the apparitions of Kiden's father. Kiden sends a letter to her mother, but the postman just misses her as she is moving out of NYC.

No Way Home

This series starts with Kiden, Tatiana, Bobby, and Lil' Bro living with Mrs. Cameron. Kiden is still looking for her parents. They come home one day to find Mrs. Cameron's apartment empty, ransacked, and covered in blood. They escape before the police arrive, but Kiden returns and finds clues to local gang banger D'Sean. While investigating his apartment, a scuffle breaks out. Tatiana bites D'Sean and shapeshifts into his likeness, then gets shot by D'Sean. Bobby knocks him out, but his gang comes in and starts a shoot-out. Kiden freezes time while holding Bobby, Lil' Bro, and Tatiana, who are able, then, to join her in the time-freeze. They take Tatiana to a hospital. The doctors realize she is a mutant when a blood transfusion makes her change shape into the donor, then call S.H.I.E.L.D. Kiden and Bobby find the gang leader. Bobby is forced to use his power to subdue him, but then loses most of his memories. Kiden, Bobby, and Lil' Bro then return to the hospital to rescue Tatiana. She hasn't fully recovered from her injuries, so they turn to Doc Reyes for help, but run away after they grow suspicious of her. Kiden then decides to track down Mrs. Palmer on her own after confronting a mysterious lady who is immune to Kiden's time-freezing powers. It turns out that Mrs. Palmer was used as bait to trap the team and exploit their mutant powers, assisted by the ghost of Kiden's dead father. As her father died, he saw into the future and realized that there is only one possible future in which Kiden survives, so he comes back to Earth as a ghost. He makes a deal with a mysterious organization to ensure her survival, but their plan is that only Kiden will survive. Tatiana is able to sneak out by drinking the blood of a mysterious "Sniper Chick" and posing as her. Lil' Bro kills her using one of his apparitions. It turns out the mysterious woman is also the daughter of the leader of the secret facility. Mr. Nixon's ghost apologizes for Kiden killing his daughter, and the man seems indifferent to his own daughter's death since he was able to see Lil' Bro's apparitions cause physical harm. He promises not to hurt Kiden, but will continue to monitor the team. The team escapes the facility and drops Mrs. Palmer at a hospital. They then vow to stay together and to "keep surviving".

Main characters
 Kiden Nixon - Mutant with the ability to slow down time and/or speed up her personal time line. Also sometimes thought to have precognitive abilities because Felon's "lil bro" used his abilities of projection to manipulate her during the story.
 Tatiana Caban - Mutant with the ability to shapeshift into any animal or human whose blood she touches.
 Cameron Palmer - Kiden Nixon's former teacher. She is a human. When she attempted suicide, Kiden saved her and roped her into the X-23 situation.
 Bobby Soul - Mutant with the ability to project his consciousness into other individuals and take control of their bodies. A side effect is that he suffers from varying degrees of amnesia after returning to his own body. He is also known as Felon.
 Lil' Bro - Bobby Soul's mute, autistic little brother. He is shown to have unknown psionic abilities that are somehow connected to Kiden's visions of the ghost of her dead father. It is insinuated that he became non-responsive after having been sexually abused by one of his mother's boyfriends.
 X-23 - Mutant with adamantium claws and regenerative healing factor. She works as a prostitute who specializes in cutting masochistic patrons. She rarely speaks and is known to engage in self-abuse (specifically, cutting).
 Zebra Daddy - X-23's pimp. He claims to love her more than any of his other 'merchandise', but he doesn't even know her name and ultimately views her as disposable property.
 Hector Morales - Kiden's school enemy, who repeatedly attacks her, though always failing to make an impact, and even tries (and fails) to kill her. He winds up in prison.
 Sniper Chick - A new character introduced in the second volume. Not much is known about her except that she is immune to Kiden's time-freezing powers and is the daughter of the head of the organization that attempts to kidnap the team.
 Nick Nixon - Kiden's police officer father, killed during a drive-by. He returns from the dead and initiates the events that bring the teens together; some of the visions of him are as a ghost, as explained in volume 2, and some are Lil' Bro's psychic projections (in volume 1).

Reception 

The series portrayal of Laura Kinney as an underage prostitute was poorly received by fans and the characters creator Craig Kyle also criticized the creative decision.

Critics from IGN reviewed the series NYX: No Way Home.
Daniel Crown gave issue #1 a score of 6.3 out of 10.
Jesse Schedeen gave issue #2 a score of 7.8 out of 10.
Jesse Schedeen also reviewed issue 3 giving it a score of 8.5 out of 10.

Collected editions

References

External links 
 NYX at Marvel.com
 
 
 

2003 comics debuts
Marvel Comics limited series
Comics set in New York City
X-23 titles